Luciano de Souza, sometimes known simply as Luciano (born 21 August 1972 in Volta Redonda), is a Brazilian-Greek former professional footballer and current football manager. His main strengths were his technique and free kick ability, along with long distance shots.

After beginning in Brazil with Santos FC, de Souza spent his entire playing career in Greece (save for two seasons in neighbours Cyprus), at one point playing for Olympiacos FC from 1998 to 2001, where he won three Greek League titles and one Greek Cup.

He also represented Skoda Xanthi, Kastoria FC, PAOK FC, AEL Limassol, Panionios FC, Atromitos F.C., PAS Giannina F.C., Panachaiki and Kalloni, where he ended his career in order to be their head coach.

Honours
Olympiacos
Greek Super League: 1998–99, 1999–2000, 2000–01
Greek Football Cup: 1998–99

References

External links
Official Website

1972 births
Living people
Brazilian footballers
Greek people of Brazilian descent
Brazilian expatriate footballers
Santos FC players
AEL Limassol players
Olympiacos F.C. players
Panionios F.C. players
Atromitos F.C. players
PAS Giannina F.C. players
Kastoria F.C. players
Xanthi F.C. players
Panachaiki F.C. players
Cypriot First Division players
Super League Greece players
Expatriate footballers in Cyprus
Expatriate footballers in Greece
Naturalized citizens of Greece
Brazilian football managers
AEL Kalloni F.C. managers
Egaleo F.C. managers
A.O. Glyfada F.C. managers
Niki Volos F.C. managers
Panargiakos F.C. managers
Ilisiakos F.C. managers
Xanthi F.C. non-playing staff
Association football midfielders
People from Volta Redonda
Sportspeople from Rio de Janeiro (state)